Royal Louis was a First Rank ship of the line of the French Royal Navy, but was never completed. Launch was scheduled to be in 1743, but on 25 December 1742 she was set alight while still on the stocks, and burnt. It was claimed that this was an act of sabotage by a Señor Pontleau, who was tried and executed for the offence.

References 

Nomenclature des navires français de 1715 á 1774. Alain Demerliac (Editions Omega, Nice – 1995). .
Winfield, Rif and Roberts, Stephen (2017) French Warships in the Age of Sail 1626-1786: Design, Construction, Careers and Fates. Seaforth Publishing. . 

Ships of the line of the French Navy
Maritime incidents in 1742